Tutt'al più (English: At most) is a song by Italian pop singer Laura Pausini. The song was composed by Angelo Valsiglio and Pietro Cremonesi and written by Roberto Casini. The song is translated into Spanish under the title ¿Por qué no?. The song was released as a promotional single from her debut album Laura Pausini.

Track listing
CDS - Promo Warner Music Italia (1993)
"Tutt'al più"

CDS - Warner Music Europa (1993)
"Tutt'al più"
"Dove sei"

CDS - Warner Music Spagna (1995)
"Gente" (Spanish Version)
"¿Por qué no?"

CDS - PCD966 Warner Music Mexico (1995)
"Amigos mios" (Laureano Brizuela)
"¿Por qué no?" (Laura Pausini)

References

1993 songs
Laura Pausini songs
Songs written by Angelo Valsiglio
Compagnia Generale del Disco singles